The Santander Golf Tour Zaragoza is a women's professional golf tournament on Spain's Santander Golf Tour that has featured on the LET Access Series. It is held at Real Club de Golf La Peñaza in Zaragoza, Spain.

At the 2021 event, England's Rachael Goodall clinched her third LET Access Series title after triumphing in a seven-hole playoff against Nina Pegova of Russia.

Winners

References

External links

LET Access Series events
Golf tournaments in Spain